HMS Puttenham (M2784) was a  inshore minesweeper of the Royal Navy. She was launched in 1956 and entered service in 1958. The 93 ships of the Ham class had names chosen from villages ending in -ham. The minesweeper was named after Puttenham.

Design and description
In the early 1950s, the Royal Navy had a requirement for large numbers of minesweepers to counter the threat to British shipping from Soviet mines in the event of a conventional Third World War. The navy's existing minesweepers were obsolete, while the increasing sophistication of modern mines meant the mine warfare forces could not be supplemented by requisitioned fishing vessels as had been done in previous wars. As the navy did not have sufficient manpower to operate all the required ships in peacetime, it was planned to lay a large number up in reserve, so they could be manned by reservists (in may cases the crews of the fishing boats which would previously have been used in the same role) in time of emergency.

Puttenham was one of the third series of Ham-class ships, with an all-wooden hull, slightly larger than the first two series. Displacement was  standard and  full load. The design armament for the class was a single Bofors 40 mm L/60 gun, although this was generally replaced by an Oerlikon 20 mm cannon.

Service
Puttenham was built by John I. Thornycroft & Company, was launched on 25 June 1956 and completed on 9 May 1958. She was laid up in reserve ashore at Rosneath in Scotland from 1958 to 1963. In 1964, Puttenham was allocated to the Royal Naval Auxiliary Service (RNXS) at Devonport.
 
In June 1967, HMS Puttenham, equipped with twelve divers under the command of Engineer-Lieutenant Roy Graham, sailed to the Isles of Scilly in search of the wrecks of the great naval disaster in 1707. Divers first discovered a cannon, and on the third dive, silver and gold coins were spotted. More than 2,000 coins and other artefacts were later recovered from the site and auctioned by Sotheby's in July 1969.

Puttenham remained in service with the RNXS at Plymouth until 1978. HMS Puttenham eventually ended service for the Royal Navy in 1980. She was sold to a private company and changes were later made to her superstructure. She continued serving in Greece as the passenger ferry Eleftheria until she was finally dismantled in Crete in November 2006, after 50 years at sea.

Notes

References

Further reading
Blackman, R.V.B. ed. Jane's Fighting Ships (1953)

External links
 A picture of HMS Puttenham while in Fleetwood, Lancashire, taken in 1978
 Pictures of Eleftheria ex HMS Puttenham before and during being scrapped in Crete, 2006.

 

Ham-class minesweepers
Royal Navy ship names
1956 ships